Jonathan Luiz Moreira Rosa Júnior (born 28 April 1999), simply known as Jonathan, is a Brazilian footballer who plays as a forward for Athletic-MG, on loan from Athletico Paranaense.

Club career
Born in Capão da Canoa, Rio Grande do Sul, Jonathan joined Internacional's youth setup in 2009, aged ten, after two years at Juventude. In September 2018, he moved to Avaí and was assigned to their under-20 squad. After being the latter club's top goalscorer in the 2019 Copa São Paulo de Futebol Júnior and the 2019 Campeonato Brasileiro de Aspirantes, he was promoted to the main squad by manager Alberto Valentim.

Jonathan made his first team – and Série A – debut on 2 September 2019, coming on as a second-half substitute for Brenner in a 1–0 away win against Fluminense. He scored his first goal thirteen days later, netting the game's only in an away defeat of Athletico Paranaense.

Honours 
Avaí
Campeonato Catarinense: 2019, 2021

References

External links
 

1998 births
Living people
Sportspeople from Rio Grande do Sul
Brazilian footballers
Association football forwards
Campeonato Brasileiro Série A players
Campeonato Brasileiro Série B players
Avaí FC players
Club Athletico Paranaense players